Ginette E. Dennis (born November 28, 1961) is a politician in Colorado. She served as Secretary of State of Colorado. She was appointed Secretary of State by Governor Bill Owens in December 2005 and succeeded Donetta Davidson. She also served in the Colorado State Senate from 1994 until 2001 and is now Alamosa County Administrator. She is a Republican.

In the late 1980s and early 1990s, she was a customer service representative for the Public Service Company of Colorado.

As Alamosa County Administrator, she was involved in bringing a radar for weather information to Alamosa County.

Gigi is currently the city manager for the City of Monte Vista since April, 2022.

References

Living people
1961 births
Secretaries of State of Colorado
Colorado Republicans